The High Frontier: Human Colonies in Space is a 1976 book by Gerard K. O'Neill, a road map for what the United States might do in outer space after the Apollo program, the drive to place a human on the Moon and beyond. It envisions large human occupied habitats in the Earth-Moon system, especially near stable Lagrangian points. Three designs are proposed: Island one (a modified Bernal sphere), Island two (a Stanford torus), and Island 3 (two O'Neill cylinders). These would be constructed using raw materials from the lunar surface launched into space using a mass driver and from near-Earth asteroids. The habitats were to spin for simulated gravity and be illuminated and powered by the Sun. Solar power satellites were proposed as a possible industry to support the habitats.

Awards 
The book won the 1977 Phi Beta Kappa Award in Science.

Illustrations
The book featured impressions of life in outer space by a number of artists including Don Davis, Rick Guidice, and Chesley Bonestell.

In popular culture
Many of the concepts illustrated in The High Frontier can be seen in the early series of the anime franchise Mobile Suit Gundam, which depicts a world where humans have migrated into space colonies. The O'Neill cylinder colony design appears frequently, largely unchanged from its original concept.
The main space station in the popular TV series, Babylon 5, is similar to an O'Neill cylinder, but with internal lighting replacing the windows and mirrors.

Criticism
Science fiction writer Charles Stross wrote a critical essay with a similar title on the feasibility of interstellar space travel and making practical use of various moons and planets in the Solar System: The High Frontier: Redux. 
Stross's criticisms do not directly apply to the O'Neill's "High Frontier" document about colonizing interplanetary space.

See also
 2081: A Hopeful View of the Human Future
 L5 Society
 Space stations and habitats in popular culture

References

Space colonization literature
Asteroid mining
1976 books